Mei Foo South, formerly called Mei Foo, is one of the 25 constituencies in the Sham Shui Po District. The constituency returns one district councillor to the Sham Shui Po District Council, with an election every four years.

Mei Foo South constituency is loosely based on the southeastern area of the Mei Foo Sun Chuen and Manhattan Hill in Lai Chi Kok with estimated population of 16,563.

Councillors represented

Mei Foo (1994–2003)

Mei Foo South (2003 to present)

Election results

2010s

2000s

1990s

References

Lai Chi Kok
Constituencies of Hong Kong
Constituencies of Sham Shui Po District Council
2003 establishments in Hong Kong
Constituencies established in 2003
1994 establishments in Hong Kong
Constituencies established in 1994